El Bordo may refer to:

Places
 El Bordo, Salta, town in Argentina
 El Bordo, Cauca, town in Colombia

Other uses
El Bordo (band), Argentinian rock band
El Bordo, 1960 novel by Sergio Galindo

See also
Bordo (disambiguation)